Wyatt Townley is an American poet, author, and yoga instructor, honored as the fourth Kansas Poet Laureate (2013–2015).

Biography
Townley is a fourth-generation Kansan and she currently lives in Shawnee Mission.

Kansas Poet Laureate
Through the Kansas Humanities Council, Townley is offering a series of programs, including workshops, lectures, and readings.

Honors and awards
 Nelson Poetry Book Award for The Afterlives of Trees
 Kansas Notable Book for The Afterlives of Trees
 The Pushcart Prize, nominee
 To the Stars poetry contest winner, sponsored by the Kansas Arts Commission ["Centering the House" and "Inside the Snow Globe" selected from The Afterlives of Trees]

Publications
 Perfectly Normal (Brooklyn, NY: The Smith), 1990.  
 The Breathing Field: Meditations on Yoga (Boston: Little, Brown and Co.), 2002.  
 Yoganetics: Be Fit, Healthy, and Relaxed One Breath at a Time (San Francisco: HarperSanFrancisco), 2003.   [reprinted in 2004 by HarperCollins World]
 Kansas City Ballet: The First Fifty Years (Kansas City, MO: Rockhill Books), 2007.  
 The Afterlives of Trees: Poems (Topeka, KS: Woodley Press), 2011.

Anthologies
 Caryn Mirriam-Goldberg (ed.). Begin Again: 150 Kansas Poems (Topeka, KS: Woodley Press), 2011.

See also

 List of U.S. states' Poets Laureate

Notes

References
 Townley named Poet Laureate of Kansas

External links
 Wyatt Townley's personal web page
 Celebrating Kansas’ Sesquicentenial

1954 births
Living people
People from Johnson County, Kansas
Poets Laureate of Kansas
Writers from Kansas